Dejan Matić (born 26 April 1978) is a Serbian pop folk singer from Bosnia and Herzegovina. He is the twin brother of Saša Matić, also a popular singer.

Early life
Dejan Matić was born in Bihać, Bosnia and Herzegovina, the son of Zoran and Dragica. He and his twin brother Aleksandar "Saša" were born prematurely and had a difficult first few weeks of life, having to be placed in incubators in a Zagreb maternity hospital. For unknown reasons, both babies became completely blind only days after birth. The family relocated to Belgrade in 1982, when the brothers were four years of age. It was in Belgrade that they attended music school, playing the piano. The Matić brothers finished their schooling in Zemun.

Career
In October 2012 Matić performed the pop duet "Čili" with Milica Pavlović on Grand Show.

Personal life
Matić married Jelena Ristić on 17 July 2012 in Bežanija, a neighborhood in Belgrade. She was four months pregnant on their wedding day with their first child, a son named Zoran, who was born in Vienna on 17 December 2012. Their second child was born 21 March 2015.

Matić previously dated Slađana Mandić, a singer from Sarajevo who later competed in the televised singing contest Zvezde Granda in 2012.

Discography
Zaigraj (2002)
Željo moja (2004)
Sinonim za ljubav (2008)
Dala si mi svega osim ljubavi (2010)
100 života (2013)
Dejan Matić (2015)

References

External links
Discography at Discogs
Dejan Matić Klub muzičara profile

1978 births
Living people
People from Drvar
21st-century Serbian male singers
Singers from Belgrade
Bosnia and Herzegovina twins
Serbian turbo-folk singers
Blind musicians
Grand Production artists
Serbs of Bosnia and Herzegovina